Global Citizen Live was the 2021 instance of the Global Citizen Festival, so named because it was broadcast live internationally from cities across six continents around the world on 25 and 26 September 2021.

Background
Global Citizen has held an annual music festival since 2012, one of the organization's main events to raise awareness of global poverty and climate change; founded in 2008, it aims to end poverty by 2030. The live 2021 festival, held across six continents, was the largest, as part of Global Citizen's 2021 Recovery Plan for the World program. Added to the festival mission was an aim to help bring an end to the COVID-19 pandemic, with a focus on vaccine equity. It was timed to occur during the G20 summit and UN general assembly meetings. Global Citizen had held "Vax Live: The Concert To Reunite The World" earlier in 2021.

Festival

Compared to Live Aid and one of the biggest international charity events ever, the festival featured live global performances from some of the world's top recording and classical artists across various cultures. More than 60 artists were scheduled to perform. Simon Le Bon, who performed with Duran Duran at both Live Aid and Global Citizen Live, said that the intention of Live Aid had "diminished in people's minds" and become forgotten. The band's bassist John Taylor said that Global Citizen Live was the closest thing to Live Aid in the age of streaming, and would not be possible without Live Aid and Band Aid creating the precedent.

Global Citizen estimated that tens of thousands of people would attend the in-person events, and millions would watch the live broadcasts. Tickets were free, and awarded at random to people who shared Global Citizen campaigns through their app; attendees had to prove either a negative COVID-19 test or vaccination against it. The organization does not aim to raise money with the festival, but encourage people to take action - and pressure leaders to take action - on global issues. However, prior to the festival, Global Citizen reaches out to corporations, organizations and even nations for financial and material pledges towards reaching its aims, which are then announced between performances during the festival.

The Duke and Duchess of Sussex made an appearance at the New York event, calling for global vaccine equity.

Performances
Several performances were pre-recorded. Some locations did not have live events open to the public, but were broadcast live. The live performances were held over the 24 hour period beginning at 1pm on September 25 in New York.

Sources:

Appearances

Politicians and leaders 

 Ban Ki-moon
Xavier Bettel
Chris Coons
 Bill de Blasio
Mario Draghi
Meryame Kitir
David Malpass
Micheál Martin
Strive Masiyiwa
Narendra Modi
Nancy Pelosi
Andrej Plenković
Pedro Sánchez
 Chuck Schumer
Erna Solberg
Aaditya Thackeray
Ursula von der Leyen

Conservationists
Jane Goodall
Monja Cohen
Sadhguru

Entertainers 

 Amitabh Bachchan

Broadcast
The festival was broadcast around the world and was available to livestream on various platforms.

 Nine Network in Australia
 VRT in Belgium
 Multishow and Bis in Brazil
 Caracol Televisión in Colombia
 TF1 and TMC in France and Monaco
 Zee TV in India
 NET in Indonesia
 Sky Uno and TV8 in Italy
 TV Azteca in Mexico
 SABC in South Africa
 RTVE Play in Spain
 BBC in the United Kingdom
 ABC (live) and FX in the United States

The television broadcast in the United Kingdom was stopped for a period to show Strictly Come Dancing, but all performances were available via the BBC iPlayer.

Broadcasting live to the same feed from six continents and the International Space Station posed a technical challenge described as "once in a generation".

Notes

References

2021 concerts
2021 television specials
Music television specials
Cultural responses to the COVID-19 pandemic
Television shows about the COVID-19 pandemic
Benefit concerts
COVID-19 pandemic benefit concerts
Music festivals in New York City
Music festivals in Germany
September 2021 events